Sachchida Nand Tripathi (born 24 July 1971) is an Indian scientist who works in the field of Atmospheric Sciences. He is a Professor in the Department of Civil Engineering at Indian Institute of Technology, Kanpur. He currently holds the Arjun Dev Joneja Faculty Chair in the department. Council for Scientific and Industrial Research Government of India awarded him with Shanti Swarup Bhatnagar Award for Science and Technology, the highest science award in India, for his outstanding contribution in the field of Earth, Atmosphere, Ocean and Planetary sciences in 2014. Prof. Tripathi is an elected Fellow of major Sciences and Engineering academies of the country: Indian National Science Academy, National Academy of Sciences, Indian National Academy of Engineering and also holds J. C. Bose Fellowship of Department of Science and Technology (India).

Early life and education 
Sachchida Nand Tripathi was born on 24 July 1971 in Varanasi, Uttar Pradesh. He obtained his B.Tech. from the Indian Institute of Technology, BHU, in 1992 and M.Tech. from the National Institute of Technology, Allahabad, in 1995. He completed his PhD at the University of Reading, United Kingdom (UK), in 2000. After two post-doctoral stints at Bhabha Atomic Research Center and Oxford University, he joined IIT Kanpur as a faculty member in 2003.

Research and Career 
Aerosol Science is Prof. Tripathi's chosen field of study. His contributions take a comprehensive science-centred approach to extremely relevant environmental issues. At the same time, he has taken an interdisciplinary approach, emphasizing the seamless connection between air quality and public health, as well as climate change impacts. For example, the Ministry of Earth Sciences – Cloud-Aerosol Interactions and Precipitation Enhancement Experiment (CAIPEX) was conceptualized and implemented as a result of his work on cloud condensation nuclei (CCN) and cloud microphysics, which he began in 2006.
Prof. Tripathi pioneered the work on aerosol induced cloud invigoration effect (AIvE) over the Indian Summer Monsoon region. He demonstrated aerosol indirect effects showing the importance of aerosol-cloud feedback via cloud condensation nuclei during summer monsoon over India for the first time. Prof. Tripathi recently led a study published in Nature Communication which shows occurrence of aerosol-induced cloud invigoration effect (AIvE) throughout the Indian region that can significantly alter cloud structures, radiation budget and impact monsoon rainfall. 
As the Principal Investigator of the Aircraft campaign under the Continental Tropical Convergence Zone (CTCZ) experiment of the Department of Science and Technology, Prof. Tripathi attempted to investigate the vertical and latitudinal variation of key aerosol properties during the early monsoon season of 2008 and 2009. Prof. Tripathi's research group measured and reported for the first time 3-D variation of aerosol optical and hygroscopic characteristics over CTCZ up to 6 km altitude. First cloud condensation nuclei closure analysis based on airborne observations during the CTCZ experiment was a key outcome of this comprehensive campaign (http://home.iitk.ac.in/~snt/CTCZ_2008.htm, http://home.iitk.ac.in/~snt/CTCZ_2009.htm). 

As a co-Principal Investigator of Interaction of Convective Organization with Monsoon Precipitation, Atmosphere, Surface and Sea: INCOMPASS field campaign Kanpur became a super site during field intensive in 2016. Kanpur supersite successfully operated a state of art eddy co-variance flux tower, ceilometer, microwave radiometer and launched radiosondes which provided a wealth of information on near surface energy balance, cloud properties and atmosphere thermodynamics which has helped better prediction of monsoon rainfall(https://sntripathi.in/category/measurements/).
Prof. Tripathi's work on the discoloration of the Taj Mahal exemplifies his proficiency in establishing an interdisciplinary strategy to pin down a compelling cause-effect relationship and reach a firm conclusion. The findings of this study led to stricter enforcement and legislative changes to prevent the monument from discolouring . 

Prof. Tripathi co-authored two very influential technical reports between 2014 and 2016 that established the groundwork for India's ambitious National Clean Air Program (NCAP). He has also aided in the development of ground-breaking new solutions for low-cost sensors 'made in India'. In India, he conducted first long-term scientific assessments of low-cost sensor-based air quality sensors. The findings of this research have been widely quoted, downloaded, and referred to by scholars around the world. He played a key role in the development and deployment of one of India's first scientifically validated sensors based air quality monitoring networks in multiple cities. Prof. Tripathi developed the Real-Time Source Apportionment (RTSA) approach, which has been published in key environmental science and technology publications, putting India at the forefront of RTSA.

Recent article Rapid night-time nanoparticle growth in Delhi driven by biomass-burning emissions published in Nature Geoscience, provides mechanistic understanding of nightly growth of particles less than 100 nanometers. This research by Prof. Tripathi has been also published in the Nature Geoscience Editorial.

Awards and recognition 
 Fellow, Institute of Advanced Sustainability Studies, Potsdam, Germany, 2021-2022
 J C Bose National Fellow, awarded by SERB, Department of Science & Technology, 2021–26
 Arjun Dev Joneja Faculty Chair, IIT-Kanpur, 2021–24
 Elected Fellow, Indian National Science Academy, 2020
 U.P. Ratna Award, Government of Uttar Pradesh, 2018
 Distinguished Alumnus Award, Banaras Hindu University, 2015
 Elected Fellow, The National Academy of Sciences, 2015
 Rajeeva and Sangeeta Lahri Chair Professor, 2015–18
 Elected Fellow, Indian National Academy of Engineering, 2015
 Shanti Swarup Bhatnagar Prize in Earth, Atmosphere, Ocean and Planetary Sciences, 2014
 Sir M. Visvesaraya Research Fellowship for excellence in teaching and Research, 2009–12
 NASA Senior Fellowship, 2009–10
 NASI-SCOPUS Young Scientist Award for highest citation in Earth Sciences, 2009
 All India Council of Technical Education, Young Teacher Career Award, 2003

Notable Projects

Streaming Analytics over Temporal Variables for Air quality Monitoring 

Prof. SN Tripathi has been the lead Principal Investigator (PI) for a DST-Intel supported project, administered by Indo-US Science and Technology Forum (IUSSTF), titled "SATVAM" (Streaming Analytics over Temporal Variables for Air quality Monitoring). The SATVAM team set out to establish India's first scientifically certified and calibrated air quality monitoring network for pollutant PM2.5, PM10, NOx, and Ozone pollutants by thoroughly analysing low-cost air quality monitoring sensors and networks in different environmental settings. The SATVAM devices were created with sensor interface circuit boards developed indigenously, low-power data communication technologies, renewable-energy-based autonomous power sources for the monitoring network, and real-time machine learning calibrations as well as spatial and temporal analytics dashboards.

Low-Cost Air Quality Sensor Technology Assessment Project in Mumbai 

In a Sensor Technology Assessment Project with Maharashtra Pollution Control Board (MPCB), four start-ups deployed the low cost air quality sensors collocated with reference monitors in the Mumbai Metropolitan Region. The project started in November 2020 and co-location data from 15 locations across Mumbai was collected for a period of 6 months. In this work, his team proposed a unique calibration method that could reduce the co-location time of particulate matter (PM) low-cost sensors with a reference monitor.

Continental Tropical Convergence Zone (CTCZ) Aircraft Experiment 

Prof. Tripathi conducted the first cloud-related experiment in India, which was funded by the Department of Science and Technology's ICRP and the Indian Space Research Organisation's Geosphere Biosphere Program (ISRO GBP). The CTCZ experiment is the first attempt to measure the 3-D variation of aerosol optical, physical and CCN properties during the pre-monsoon and monsoon seasons over the Indian Continental Tropical Convergence Zone (CTCZ).

Interaction of convective organisation with monsoon precipitation, atmosphere, surface, and sea 

INCOMPASS (Interaction of convective organisation with monsoon precipitation, atmosphere, surface, and sea), a joint Indo-UK project under the Monsoon Mission was aimed at better understanding of land surface and atmospheric interactions and their role in monsoon genesis and progression over Indian land mass. The INCOMPASS field campaign in 2016 combines aircraft and ground observations of the Indian monsoon, with the ultimate goal of improving monsoon rainfall forecasting. Prof Tripathi was a co-PI of INCOMPASS and PI of Kanpur supersite which collected a wealth of data. 
Prof. Tripathi was Principal Investigator in the international 2008 TIGERZ experiment intense operating period (IOP) in the Indo Gangetic Plain (IGP) around the industrial city of Kanpur, India, during the pre-monsoon conducted in collaboration with the NASA Goddard Space flight Center and Canada. Under TIGERZ Sun photometers from the Aerosol Robotic Network (AERONET) took frequent measurements of aerosol properties to describe pollution and dust in a region where complex aerosol mixtures and semi-bright surface effects make satellite retrieval methods difficult.

National Aerosol Facility 

Prof. Tripathi's vision for lateral translation of knowledge and expertise to serve the crucial cause of academic involvement in nuclear safety investigations is demonstrated by establishing the National Aerosol Facility (NAF) in collaboration with BRNS/BARC, Department of Atomic Energy, India. This facility focuses on aerosol safety issues specific to Indian Pressurized Heavy Water reactors, instead of most other studies that focus on Light Water reactors, such as the THAI facility in Germany, the PHEBUS-FP programme in France, and several others across the world. He established relevant experimental programmes and theoretical modelling foundations along with a team of young researchers drawn across several institutions to conduct the studies. The NAF for PHWR safety research is unique and comprehensive, putting India on par with developed nations in terms of meeting the futuristic requirement for safety research alongside the rise of nuclear power to meet India's energy security demands.

National Clean Air Program 

The Ministry of Environment, Forests and Climate Change (MoEF&CC) started the National Clean Air Program ( NCAP) in 2018 with the goal of improving air quality in cities across India, of which Prof. Tripathi is expert member. NCAP is a long-term, time-bound national policy to address India's toxic air problem holistically. By 2024, the plan aims to reduce Particulate Matter concentrations by 20-30% compared to baseline of 2017 (https://prana.cpcb.gov.in/#/partners).

Knowledge Partners to National Clean Air Program 

Prof. Tripathi created an alliance of technical institutes (IITs, NITs and National Laboratories), National Knowledge Network (NKN), which will work with cities to meet NCAP targets by creating capacity in air quality management at various levels .

75 Top Scientists Under 50 in India 

Prof. S.N.Tripathi featured in the publication “75 under 50 scientists shaping today’s India”, in the series commemorating the Department of Science and Technology’s Golden Jubilee Year.

References

External links
 Sachchida Nand Tripathi's Home Page

1971 births
Living people
Indian meteorologists
Place of birth missing (living people)
20th-century Indian earth scientists
Recipients of the Shanti Swarup Bhatnagar Award in Earth, Atmosphere, Ocean & Planetary Sciences